Gulfport is the second-largest city in Mississippi after the state capital, Jackson. Along with Biloxi, Gulfport is the co-county seat of Harrison County and the larger of the two principal cities of the Gulfport-Biloxi, Mississippi Metropolitan Statistical Area. As of the 2020 census, the city of Gulfport had a total population of 72,926, with 416,259 in the metro area as of 2018. It is also home to the US Navy Atlantic Fleet Seabees.

History

This area was occupied by indigenous cultures for thousands of years, culminating in the historic encounter between the Choctaw and the first European explorers of the area. Along the Gulf Coast, French colonists founded nearby Biloxi, and Mobile in the 18th century, well before the area was acquired from France by the United States in 1803 in the Louisiana Purchase. By the Indian Removal Act of 1830, the United States completed treaties to extinguish Choctaw and other tribal land claims and removed them to Indian Territory, now Oklahoma. In that period, the other four of the Five Civilized Tribes in the Southeast were also removed, to make way for white settlers to take over the lands and develop them for agriculture, especially cotton.

An early settlement near this location, known as Mississippi City, appeared on a map of Mississippi from 1855.  Mississippi City was the county seat of Harrison County from 1841 to 1902, but is now a suburb in east Gulfport.

Gulfport was incorporated on July 28, 1898. The city was founded by William H. Hardy, who was president of the Gulf and Ship Island Railroad (G&SIRR) that connected inland lumber mills to the coast. He was joined by Joseph T. Jones, who later took over the G&SIRR, dredged the harbor in Gulfport, and opened the shipping channel to the sea. In 1902, the harbor was completed and the Port of Gulfport became a working seaport. On April 28, 1904 the Treasury Department changed the port of entry for the district of the Pearl River from Shieldsboro to Gulfport.  It now accounts for millions of dollars in annual sales and tax revenue for the state of Mississippi.

In 1910, the U.S. Post Office and Customhouse was built here. This Gulfport Post office was listed on the National Register of Historic Places in 1984.

In March 1916, Mayor George M. Foote announced that the Andrew Carnegie foundation was going to aid in construction of a Carnegie Library in Gulfport. The city had agreed to providing matching funds for the construction as well as committing to provide operating funds. In the 20th century, the city developed as an important port; as it was served by railroads from the interior, it stimulated town growth by providing a way to get products to markets.

The city's location on the coast made it vulnerable to hurricanes and it weathered several. But on August 17, 1969, Gulfport and the Mississippi Gulf Coast were hit by Hurricane Camille. Measured by central pressure, Camille was the second-strongest hurricane to make U.S. landfall in recorded history.  The area of total destruction in Harrison County was 68 square miles (180 km2).[11] The total estimated cost of damage was $1.42 billion (1969 USD, $9 billion 2012 USD).[12] Camille was the second-most expensive hurricane in the United States, up to that point (behind Hurricane Betsy).[13] The storm directly killed 143 people in Alabama, Mississippi, and Louisiana.

Hurricane Katrina

On August 29, 2005, Gulfport was hit by the strong eastern side of Hurricane Katrina. Much of the city was flooded or destroyed that day by the strong, hurricane-force winds, which lasted more than 16 hours, and a storm surge exceeding 28 feet (9 m) in some sections.

Hurricane Katrina damaged more than 40 Mississippi libraries, gutting the Gulfport Public Library, first floor, and breaking windows on the second floor, beyond repair. It required total reconstruction.

Although Katrina's damage was far more widespread, it was not the fiercest hurricane to hit Gulfport.  Katrina, a Category 3 storm at landfall, was dwarfed by Hurricane Camille, a Category 5 storm, which had hit Gulfport and neighboring communities on August 17, 1969 with 175 mph sustained winds compared to Katrina's 120 mph sustained winds.

The Sun Herald newspaper in Biloxi-Gulfport won the 2006 Pulitzer Prize in journalism for its Katrina coverage. The local ABC television affiliate, WLOX, won the Peabody Award for its Hurricane Katrina coverage.

Geography

Gulfport Formation, here named in Harrison Co., southeastern MS, described as barrier ridge composed of white, medium- to fine-grained sand, yellow-orange near surface. Thickness ranges form 5.0 to 9.5 m. Overlies Biloxi Formation. Age is late Pleistocene.

Gulfport Formation is limited to a 1- to 3-km-wide discontinuous barrier ridge belt that borders the Gulf mainland shore. Commonly overlies Prairie Formation (alluvium) landward and Biloxi Formation (shelf deposits) near shore. Grades upward from poorly to moderately sorted shoreface sands to foreshore sand and dunes. Fig. 1 shows unit extending from Gulfport, MS, eastward to the mouth of the Ochlockonee River, Franklin County, Florida. Deposited during the Sangamonian.

Neighborhoods
The city listed 39 official neighborhoods in 2000. These neighborhoods are sometimes subdivisions or accumulations of gradual home development. These include:

 Lyman
 Orange Grove
 Biloxi River
 Lorraine
 The Reserve
 Pine Hills
 Bayou Bernard Industrial District
 Bayou View North
 The Island
 Fernwood
 Handsboro
 College Park
 Silver Ridge
 Great Southern
 Mississippi City
 Gooden
 East Park
 Bayou View South
 Magnolia Grove
 East Beach
 Broadmoor
 Soria City
 CBD
 State Port & Jones Park
 West Beach
 Gaston Point
 Fairgrounds
 Central Gulfport
 25th Avenue Commercial
 Original Gulfport
 Mid-City
 Brickyard Bayou
 North Gulfport Industrial Center
 Turkey Creek
 North Gulfport
 CB Base
 Gulfport Heights
 Forest Heights
 Sports Super Complex

Climate
Gulfport has a humid subtropical climate, which is strongly moderated by the Gulf of Mexico. Winters are short and generally mild; cold spells do occur, but seldom last long. Snow flurries are rare in the city, with no notable accumulation occurring most years. Summers are generally long, hot and humid, though the city's proximity to the Gulf prevents extreme summer highs, as seen farther inland. Gulfport is subject to extreme weather, most notably tropical storm activity through the Gulf of Mexico.

Demographics

2020 census

As of the 2020 United States census, there were 72,926 people, 25,559 households, and 15,584 families residing in the city.

2010 census
According to the census of 2010, there were 67,793 people living in the city. The population density was 1,191.4 people per square mile (459.9/km). The city had 50,825 or 74.97% of its population at the age of 18 and above. The racial makeup of the city was 56.86% White, 36.07% African American, 0.39% Native American, 1.69% Asian, 0.14% Pacific Islander, 2.13% from other races, and 2.73% from two or more races. Results show that 5.19% of the population was Hispanic/Latino of any race.

There were 31,602 housing units at an average density of 555.4 per square mile (214.4/km) with 83.24% of housing units occupied and an average of 2.57 persons living in each occupied housing unit.

Comparing the 2000 and 2010 Census, the population of the city went down while the total number of housing units rose. This can be attributed to Hurricane Katrina, which destroyed housing and displaced people. New housing development has continued with a mixture of redevelopment from hurricane damage, though not all of the displaced population returned.

As of the census of 2000, there were 26,943 households, out of which 32.1% had children under the age of 18 living with them, 42.6% were married couples living together, 18.2% had a female householder with no husband present, and 34.5% were non-families. 27.7% of all households were made up of individuals, and 8.5% had someone living alone who was 65 years of age or older. The average household size was 2.51 and the average family size was 3.07.

In Gulfport, the population dispersal was 26.0% under the age of 18, 11.1% from 18 to 24, 30.4% from 25 to 44, 21.1% from 45 to 64, and 11.4% who were 65 years of age or older. The median age was 34 years. For every 100 females, there were 98.2 males. For every 100 females age 18 and over, there were 96.1 males. The median income for a household in the city was $32,779, and the median income for a family was $39,213. Males had a median income of $29,220 versus $21,736 for females. The per capita income for the city was $17,554. 17.7% of the population and 14.1% of families were below the poverty line. Out of the total population, 25.8% of those under the age of 18 and 13.7% of those 65 and older were living below the poverty line.

Gulfport is the location of Gulfport-Biloxi International Airport. The airport suffered extensive damage due to Hurricane Katrina. A major renovation project is for the most part completed and it has resumed commercial air service.

Economy
According to Gulfport's 2017 Comprehensive Annual Financial Report, the top employers in the city were:

Tourism

From its beginnings as a lumber port, Gulfport evolved into a diversified city. With about 6.7 miles (10.7 kilometres) of white sand beaches along the Gulf of Mexico, Gulfport has become a tourism destination, due in large part to Mississippi's coast casinos. Gulfport has served as host to popular cultural events such as the "World's Largest Fishing Rodeo," "Cruisin' the Coast" (a week of classic cars), “Black Spring Break” and "Smokin' the Sound" (speedboat races). Gulfport is a thriving residential community with a strong mercantile center.  There are historic neighborhoods and home sites, as well as diverse shopping opportunities and several motels scattered throughout to accommodate golfing, gambling, and water-sport tourism. Gulfport is also home to the Island View Casino, one of twelve casinos on the Mississippi Gulf Coast.

Infrastructure

Law enforcement

Gulfport Police
The Gulfport Police Department has 160 sworn personnel and 80 civilian staff.

U.S. Coast Guard
The U.S. Coast Guard operates 9 boats out of the port of Gulfport 4 of which are Patrol Boats.  The Gulfport station has 110 members which include Active, Reserve and Coast Guard Auxiliary who respond to an average of 300 search and rescue cases annually.

Fire protection and EMS

Gulfport Fire Department 
The Gulfport Fire Department was founded in 1908 and currently provides fire suppression, HAZMAT response, and technical rescue services within the city limits of Gulfport, Mississippi  . The GFD operates out of 11 active stations and is staffed by professional firefighters. The GFD works in conjunction with American Medical Response for EMS related emergencies.

Transportation

Air
Gulfport/Biloxi and the Gulf Coast area is served by the Gulfport-Biloxi International Airport.

Roads
Major roads and highways serve Gulfport. Interstate 10 runs east-west through the middle section of Gulfport. U.S. 90, following the coast in this region, runs east-west through the downtown area. U.S. 49 from the north terminates in Gulfport.

Trains
Until Hurricane Katrina in 2005, Amtrak's Sunset Limited from Los Angeles to Orlando made stops in Gulfport station. Well into the 1960s, the Louisville and Nashville ran several trains daily, making stops in Gulfport--Crescent, Gulf Wind, Humming Bird, Pan-American and Piedmont Limited—varied destinations including New Orleans, Cincinnati, Atlanta, New York City and Jacksonville.

Education

The City of Gulfport is served by the Gulfport School District and the Harrison County School District. The Harrison County Campus of Mississippi Gulf Coast Community College is also located in Gulfport.

Before Hurricane Katrina, William Carey University had a satellite campus in Gulfport. In 2009, the university moved to its new Tradition Campus, constructed off Mississippi Highway 67 in north Harrison County.

The Gulf Park Campus of the University of Southern Mississippi is located in Long Beach, just west of Gulfport.  In 2012, repairs and renovations to campus buildings were still in progress following extensive damage in 2005 by Hurricane Katrina.

Media

Gulfport's local newspaper is The Sun Herald. It is also served by two television stations, the ABC affiliate WLOX and CBS on WLOX-DT2, the Fox affiliate WXXV, WXXV Digital signal on Channel 25.2 as NBC 25 NBC affiliate, and WXXV Digital signal on Channel 25.3 as The Gulf Coast CW CW+ affiliate. There are also seven radio stations in the Gulfport area.

Notable people
 Mahmoud Abdul-Rauf, former NBA point guard for the Denver Nuggets, Sacramento Kings and Vancouver Grizzlies
 Stacey Abrams, American politician, lawyer, and author
 Thomas H. Anderson, Jr., Ambassador of the United States to Barbados, Dominica, St. Lucia, Antigua, St. Vincent, and St. Christopher-Nevis-Anguilla from 1984 to 1986, was born in Gulfport
 Tommy Armstrong, Jr., quarterback for the Nebraska Cornhuskers
 Jerome Barkum, former wide receiver and tight end for the New York Jets from 1972 to 1983 in the National Football League
 Milton Barney, 1990 AFL Ironman of the Year
 William Joel Blass, attorney and educator
 Timmy Bowers, professional basketball player
 Rod Davis, professional football player, played for the Minnesota Vikings
 Brett Favre, quarterback in the National Football League for the Green Bay Packers, New York Jets and Minnesota Vikings, born in Gulfport
 William H. Hardy, co-founder of the city of Gulfport
 Josh Hayes, professional motorcycle roadracer, AMA Superbike Championship title winner
 William Gardner Hewes, politician and Mayor of Gulfport
 Jonathan Holder, Major League Baseball pitcher
 Boyce Holleman, attorney, politician and actor
 Jaimoe, original member and drummer of the Allman Brothers Band, grew up in Gulfport
 Joseph T. Jones, co-founder of the city of Gulfport 
 Matt Lawton, former Major League Baseball player best known for his stint with the Minnesota Twins
 Matt Luke, former head coach of the Ole Miss Rebels football team of the University of Mississippi.
 Stanford Morse (1926-2002), member of the Mississippi State Senate, 1956–1964; Republican candidate for lieutenant governor in 1963.
 John C. Robinson (1903-1954), “The Brown Condor”, aviator and civil rights activist
 Stuart Roosa, Colonel, US Air Force, Apollo 14 astronaut, Command Module Pilot. Brought seeds to moon that germinated in space
 Tiffany Travis, former WNBA Basketball player, played for Charlotte Sting
 Natasha Trethewey, Pulitzer Prize winning poet, former Poet Laureate of the United States, and Professor at Emory University, born in Gulfport
 Tim Young, professional baseball player, played for the Montreal Expos and the Boston Red Sox

Filmed in Gulfport
 Precious Cargo, 2016 film starring Bruce Willis, Mark-Paul Gosselaar, and Claire Forlani.
 The Astronaut Wives Club, TV series.
 Christmas in Mississippi, 2017 TV movie starring Jana Kramer.

See also

Grass Lawn (Gulfport, Mississippi)
Great Southern Golf Club
Gulf and Ship Island Railroad
Gulf Coast Military Academy
Gulfport Army Air Field Hangar
Gulfport Veterans Administration Medical Center Historic District
Historic Grand Hotels on the Mississippi Gulf Coast
List of Mayors of Gulfport, Mississippi
Mississippi Aquarium
Mississippi City, Mississippi
National Register of Historic Places listings in Harrison County, Mississippi
Old Gulfport High School
Turkey Creek Community Historic District
United States Post Office and Customhouse (Gulfport, Mississippi)
 United States container ports

References

External links

 City of Gulfport Official website	

 
Cities in Mississippi
Cities in Harrison County, Mississippi
County seats in Mississippi
Cities in Gulfport–Biloxi metropolitan area
Port cities and towns of the United States Gulf Coast
Populated coastal places in Mississippi